Army Aviation Corps may refer to:

 Army Aviation Corps (Germany), the army aviation element of the German Army
 Army Aviation Corps (India), the army aviation element of the Indian Army
 Australian Army Aviation Corps
 Pakistan Army Aviation Corps

See also
 Army Air Corps (disambiguation)
 List of army aviation units for other units that may also be informally termed Air Corps